Ertha Pascal-Trouillot (born 13 August 1943) is a Haitian politician who served as the provisional President of Haiti for 11 months in 1990 and 1991. She was the first woman in Haitian history to hold that office and the first female president of African descent in the Americas.

Childhood
Ertha Pascal-Trouillot was born on Aug. 13, 1943, in the well-to-do suburb of Pétion-Ville in the cool hills above the crowded capital.  Her father, Thimbles, was an iron worker and died when she was young. Her mother Louise (née Dumornay) was a seamstress and embroiderer. Pascal-Trouillot was the ninth of ten children. When she was 10 years old, she and one of her brothers went to the Lycée François Duvalier and was mentored by her future husband, Ernst Trouillot, who was 21 years her senior.

University
When she started university, she wanted to pursue a career in science but she met her mentor who convinced her to pursue it in law and later in politics. In 1971, she received her law degree from the École de Droit des Gonaïves in Port-au-Prince.

Career
During the Duvalier dynasty, Pascal-Trouillot became the first female judge in Haiti upon becoming serving on the Court of First Instance. Her husband served as counsel to the National Bank, from which the dictators are said to have obtained a fortune (though they were not supporters of the Duvaliers). She eventually became the first woman justice in the Supreme Court of Haiti. While serving as Chief Justice, she became the country's provisional president on March 13, 1990, and was made responsible to organize a general election. It was to her credit that she could bring about violence-free elections which brought Jean Bertrand Aristide to the post of president with a 67% win.

Away from the public eye, Ertha Pascal-Trouillot had a committee which helped in running the affairs of the country and also the elections. She also got the support of the army. After the victory of Jean Bertrand Aristide, she was arrested and charged for the Coup. It has never been proved that Ertha Pascal-Trouillot was in fact involved in the Coup. Due to the US intervention she was released in a day. She then quit her role in active politics and left Haiti. Ertha Pascal-Trouillot is back in Haiti but away from the public eye. She has immersed herself into the work of compiling the history of Haiti.

Mrs. Pascal-Trouillot primary task as Provisional President was to steer Haiti toward early elections in coordination with a 19-member Council of State that had been given veto power over her. She was in charge of managing the council and trying to avoid outright combat and she was also expected to act and complete the task of her role and serve the people. Mrs. Pascal-Trouillot spent her first day as President today working in very big, three-story yellow house, studying a list of more than 40 names for cabinet posts. She also drew up communication announcing the reopening of schools, which had closed more than a week earlier because of protests against Lieut. Gen. Prosper Avril, Haiti's most recent military ruler.

Trouillot steered Haiti through its first major test from a dictatorship to a new democracy with free democratic elections. Ertha Pascal Trouillot became a great role model for Haitian girls and women. According to the article “L’union Suite,” ‘‘More than twenty years after Pascal-Trouillot brave leadership, Haiti’s nascent and fragile democracy still stands. The Haitian people have lived through two more coups d’etats, economic turmoil, and natural disasters. But Haiti has one president who’s served out both his mandates and participated in two successful transitions of power. That’s the legacy of Ertha Pascal-Trouillot. She helped them to be the best that they are and encouraged them to become powerful and apply for jobs in the government and also becoming leaders. After her reign, a lot of women began running for a lot of important roles in the place, including senators, deputy, ministers and even president.’’

Personal life
Ertha Pascal-Trouillot was the first Haitian woman president. She became the first provisional woman president. She was a lawyer, writer, teacher and Supreme Court justice. "This is a very intelligent woman, a very strong personality, a person that cannot be manipulated," said Karl Auguste, who worked with her on a commission to revise Haiti's civil and penal codes after the collapse of the previous dictator Dr. Duvalier four years ago. She was very different from the other elected presidents because she was strong and had the determination to not bow down to anyone. "She is not going to be a puppet," a Western diplomat said.

Mrs. Pascal-Trouillot's brother Alix was paralyzed from the waist down by a bullet from one of the Duvalier soldiers. Another brother, Andre, was arrested and threatened with execution. In 1986, Minister of Justice Francois Latortue appointed Mrs. Pascal-Trouillot to the Supreme Court. She was the first woman to serve on the court. Mr. La Tordue said that he "knew she was one of the most outstanding women lawyers in Haiti." Mrs. Pascal trouillot was a very intelligent woman. She exceeded the expectations the people had of her and used her confidence to rule in the palace. She had the determination to rebuild Haiti after the reign of the Duvaliers were over. She reopened schools because she believed that education was the most important tool for every student.

One of the major forces in shaping her life was a man more than 20 years her senior, Ernst Trouillot, a journalist, lawyer, and teacher, and father of her step-son, the anthropologist Michel-Rolph Trouillot. She met Mr. Trouillot when she was a teenage girl in one of his social classes and due to her intelligence, he encouraged her to go to law school. As president of the Bar Association, he watched her being sworn in at the Palace of Justice in 1971 and swooned. Less than four months later they were married. He later died of a stroke 3 years ago. Mrs. Pascal-Trouillot now lives with their 15-year-old daughter, Yantha.

See also 
 First women lawyers around the world

References

Further reading 
 Geffrard, R. (2017). Seule Ertha Pascal Trouillot a répondu à l'appel. [online] Le Nouvelliste. Available at: http://lenouvelliste.com/lenouvelliste/article/92490/Seule-Ertha-Pascal-Trouillot-a-repondu-a-lappel [Accessed 13 Dec. 2017].
 Haiti Observer. (2017). Ertha Pascal-Trouillot - The Haitian Woman President. [online] Available at: http://www.haitiobserver.com/blog/previous-government/ertha-pascal-trouillot-the-haitian-woman-president.html [Accessed 20 Feb. 2017].
 Pascal-Trouillot, Ertha 1943–." Contemporary Black Biography. . Encyclopedia.com. 13 Dec. 2017 <http://www.encyclopedia.com>.
 Geffrard, R. (2017). Seule Ertha Pascal Trouillot a répondu à l'appel. [online] Le Nouvelliste. Available at: http://lenouvelliste.com/lenouvelliste/article/92490/Seule-Ertha-Pascal-Trouillot-a-repondu-a-lappel [Accessed 13 Dec. 2017].

1943 births
1990s in Haiti
20th-century Haitian politicians
20th-century judges
20th-century Haitian women politicians
21st-century Haitian writers
21st-century Haitian women writers
Female heads of government
Female heads of state
Haitian judges
Haitian non-fiction writers
Haitian people of Mulatto descent
Haitian women in politics
Haitian women writers
Living people
People from Port-au-Prince
Presidents of Haiti
Women chief justices
20th-century women judges